A 0/1-polytope is a convex polytope generated by the convex hull of a subset of d coordinates value 0 or 1, {0,1}d. The full domain is the unit hypercube with cut planes passing through these coordinates. A d-polytope requires at least d+1 vertices, and can't be all in the same hyperplanes.

n-simplex polytopes for example can be generated (n+1) vertices, using the origin, and one vertex along each primary axis, (1,0....), etc.

References

Polytopes
Convex hulls
Planes (geometry)